In enzymology, a D-ribulokinase is an enzyme that catalyzes the chemical reaction

ATP + D-ribulose  ADP + D-ribulose 5-phosphate

Thus, the two substrates of this enzyme are ATP and D-ribulose, whereas its two products are ADP and D-ribulose 5-phosphate.

This enzyme belongs to the family of transferases, specifically those transferring phosphorus-containing groups (phosphotransferases) with an alcohol group as acceptor.  The systematic name of this enzyme class is ATP:D-ribulose 5-phosphotransferase. This enzyme is also called D-ribulokinase (phosphorylating).  This enzyme participates in pentose and glucuronate interconversions.

References

 
 

EC 2.7.1
Enzymes of unknown structure